Cardamom may refer to:

Botanical
Cardamom (or cardamon), species within two genera of the ginger family Zingiberaceae, namely Elettaria and Amomum
Black cardamom (or brown cardamom), a plant in the family Zingiberaceae having pods used as a spice
Green cardamom, Elettaria cardamomum, a plant in the family Zingiberaceae having pods used as a spice
Alleppey Green Cardamom, a variety of cardamom
Coorg Green Cardamom, a variety of cardamom
Dwarf cardamom, Alpinia nutans, not a spice.

Languages
Cardamom Khmer (or Western Khmer), a Khmer language dialect spoken by some Khmer people

Places
Cardamom Hills, located in south-central Kerala, India
Cardamom Mountains (or Krâvanh Mountains), a mountain range in the south-west area of Cambodia, near the border with Thailand
Cardamom Town (theme park) in Norway